Club Haro Deportivo is a Spanish football team based in Haro, in the autonomous community of La Rioja. Founded in 1914, it plays in Tercera División - Group 16, holding home matches at Estadio El Mazo, with a capacity of 4,300 seats.

History 
Haro Deportivo finished the 2017-18 season in the 4th position in the Tercera División. In the 2018-19 season Haro became champion of the Tercera División, Group 16 and promoted to the Segunda División B.

Season to season 

2 seasons in Segunda División B
36 seasons in Tercera División

Current squad

References

External links
Official website 
Futbolme team profile 
Club & stadium history 

Association football clubs established in 1914
Football clubs in La Rioja (Spain)
1914 establishments in Spain